Jameela is a genus of butterflies in the family Lycaenidae.

Species
Jameela albiplaga Tite, 1963
Jameela palmyra (Felder, 1860) (type species)

References

  2010: "New Australian butterfly genus Jameela gen. nov. (Lepidoptera: Lycaenidae: Polyommatinae: Polyommatini) revealed by morphological, ecological and molecular data". Entomological Science 13 (1): 134-143. DOI: 10.1111/j.1479-8298.2010.00368.x. Abstract.
, 1992. "A generic classification of the tribe Polyommatini of the Oriental and Australian regions (Lepidoptera, Lycaenidae, Polyommatinae)". Bulletin of the University of Osaka Prefecture, Series B, Vol. 44, Suppl.
, 1963. "A synonymic list of the genus Nacaduba and allied genera (Lepidoptera, Lycaenidae)". Bulletin of the British Museum (Natural History) Entomology 13(4):67-116, 91 figs., pls. 1,2.

Polyommatini